Sium bracteatum (known commonly as jellico and large jellico) is a species of flowering plant in the family Apiaceae. It is endemic to Saint Helena. It is protected in Diana's Peak National Park, but proper management practices have not yet been established. It is threatened by fragmentation of its populations, introduced species of plants, and possibly hybridization with Sium burchellii.

This species was once eaten by the island residents as a raw vegetable like celery.

References

bracteatum
Vulnerable plants
Flora of Saint Helena
Flora of Ascension Island
Flora of Tristan da Cunha
Taxonomy articles created by Polbot
Taxobox binomials not recognized by IUCN